The 2022 PGA EuroPro Tour was the 20th season of the PGA EuroPro Tour, one of four third-tier tours recognised by the European Tour. In September, the tour announced that the 2022 season would be the last.

Schedule 
The following table lists official events during the 2022 season.

Order of Merit
The Order of Merit was titled as the Race to Lough Erne and was based on prize money won during the season, calculated in Pound sterling. The top five players on the tour (not otherwise exempt) earned status to play on the 2023 Challenge Tour.

Notes

References

2022 in golf